Léonor-Joseph Havin (1799-1868) was a French politician.

Biography
He was born in Paris. He studied law, became Justice of the Peace at Saint-Lô (1830), and for the following seventeen years was Deputy from the Department of Manche. He was a prime mover in the agitation which led to the February Revolution, but allied himself with the Moderates in the National Assembly of 1848–49. He continued to take a prominent part in the republican government up to 1851, but after the coup d'état he lost his position in the State Council, and his influence was henceforth exerted through his journal, Le Siècle, which became noted for good judgment and loyalty to liberal principles.

References
 

1799 births
1868 deaths
Politicians from Paris
French republicans
Members of the 2nd Chamber of Deputies of the July Monarchy
Members of the 3rd Chamber of Deputies of the July Monarchy
Members of the 4th Chamber of Deputies of the July Monarchy
Members of the 5th Chamber of Deputies of the July Monarchy
Members of the 6th Chamber of Deputies of the July Monarchy
Members of the 7th Chamber of Deputies of the July Monarchy
Members of the 1848 Constituent Assembly
Members of the 3rd Corps législatif of the Second French Empire